INS Kadamba or Naval Base Karwar or Project Seabird is an Indian Navy base located near Karwar in Karnataka. The first phase of construction of the base, code-named Project Seabird, was completed in 2005 and the base was commissioned on 31 May 2005. Development of Phase II commenced in 2011. INS Kadamba is currently the third largest Indian naval base, and is expected to become the largest naval base in the eastern hemisphere after completion of expansion Phase IIB. The construction of Naval Base covers an area of 11,169 acres in Phase I. The Navy’s aircraft carrier INS Vikramaditya is based at Karwar. The base also has the country’s first sealift facility, a unique “shiplift” and transfer system for docking and undocking ships and submarines.

History
During the Indo-Pakistan War of 1971, the Indian Navy faced security challenges for its Western Fleet in Mumbai Harbour due to congestion in the shipping lanes from commercial shipping traffic, fishing boats and tourists. At the end of the war, various options were considered on addressing these concerns. Alternative locations for a base on the west coast were evaluated, including Thiruvananthapuram, Kannur and Thoothukudi.

In the early 1980s, then Chief of the Naval Staff Admiral Oscar Stanley Dawson conceived of a dedicated naval base sandwiched between the craggy hills of the Western Ghats and the Arabian Sea near Karwar in Karnataka state. Located south of the naval bases in Mumbai and Goa and north of Kochi, the location had significant advantages as being very close to the world's busiest shipping route between the Persian Gulf and east Asia and out of range of most strike aircraft from neighboring countries. It also offered a natural deep-water harbour and significant land area for expansion, allowing larger aircraft carriers to berth. However, due to a variety of reasons, including the 1991 economic crisis, development was delayed.

Project Seabird
In 1999, following Pokhran-II, then Defence Minister George Fernandes approved Project Seabird to pursue the construction of the new naval base at Karwar. Larsen & Toubro was the lead contractor for the marine works on the harbour, in partnership with Hochtief, Ballast Nadem Dredging of the Netherlands, Radisson of Australia and Nedeco of The Netherland. Over  of breakwater were constructed using over 4.4 million cubic metres of rock to protect the harbour. The Binaga Bay was dredged and its rock outcrops blasted to allow even large aircraft carriers to turn inside the bay. Anjadip Island is one of the two islands to which the breakwaters are linked for reinforcement. A second channel will be added to the base to allow warships to enter and exit the port simultaneously.

Phase I expansion

The expanded base opened in 2007, with space for up to 11 front-line warships and 10 smaller FIC-type boats. Key facilities include the 10,000 tonne,  ship lift, a ship transfer system for dry docking at the Naval Ship Repair Yard, and a 141-bed naval hospital INHS Patanjali. Naval Ship Repair Yard commenced functioning in July 2006 and the ship-lift was commissioned on 8 November 2006. Commodore K P Ramachandran was the first Commanding Officer of INS Kadamba.

Phase II expansion

Development of Phase II of INS Kadamba was supposed to commence in 2011 but got delayed due to lack of environmental clearance. The environment clearance for Phase II was granted in June 2014 on a priority basis for strategic reasons by the environment minister Prakash Javadekar of Narendra Modi government. The work will now commenced in 2016 and is expected to be completed by 2022.

Under the proposed expansion plans, a 3,000 feet long runway will be built. If the Centre and the State send request to the Indian Navy seeking to utilize the runway for civil aviation aircraft, the runway length will be increased to 6,000 feet. Post completion as many as 30 warships can be anchored at the base and it would have a hangar to hold as many military aircraft. The Indian Navy, through the State government, has acquired 11,334 acres of land which includes 8,661 acres of forest land.

Phase II-A

Phase II-A is expected to commence in 2017 and end in 2021–2022 with an expected cost of Rs 19,600 crore. The project is expected to generate large scale employment and infuse money into the local economy. In this phase, the base will undergo the following upgrades:
 Eight operational jetties, two refit jetties, four cover drivers and full-pledged dockyards to handle additional ships
 Naval air station for helicopters, unmanned aerial vehicles and medium transport aircraft with a civil terminal
 INHS Patanjali will be upgraded from 141-bed to 400-bed hospital
 Second Kendriya Vidyalaya
After completion of this phase, the base will have over one lakh personnel working there, apart from their families living in an upcoming residential township. Apart from berthing INS Vikramaditya, two more aircraft carriers will be homeported here. For this, two more jetties will be used. A few of the  submarines will also be based here.

Phase II-B
After the completion of this phase of the project, INS Kadamba will be able to base 50 front-line warships, and will be the biggest naval base east of the Suez canal.

Important milestones
Initial Sanction - 1985
Foundation Stone laid - 24 October 1986 
Acquisition of land - 1985–1988
Master Plan & DPR - 1990
Truncated Phase 1 sanctioned - Oct 1995
Execution of project - 1995–2005
Rehabilitation Phase 1 - 1995–1999
Construction commenced - 2000
Priority Housing - February 2003
Breakwater completed - February 2004
Sailors Residential Colony - July 2004 
Anchorage completed - November 2004
Pier completed - February 2005
Officers Colony at Kamath Bay - February 2004
Docking of the first navy ship INS Shardul
Karwar Naval Hospital - Feb 2005 (Temporary location)
Ship Lift installed - Apr 2005
Visit by US Defence Secretary Ashton Carter with Defence Minister Manohar Parrikar - 12 April 2016

See also
 Indian navy 
 List of Indian Navy bases
 List of active Indian Navy ships
INS Varsha, the other major naval base, which is being developed on India's east coast.
INS Vajrakosh, missile and ammunition base at Karwar
INHS Patanjali, naval hospital at Karwar
Karwar Airport

 Integrated commands and units
 Armed Forces Special Operations Division
 Defence Cyber Agency
 Integrated Defence Staff
 Integrated Space Cell
 Indian Nuclear Command Authority
 Indian Armed Forces
 Special Forces of India

 Other lists
 Strategic Forces Command
 List of Indian Air Force stations
 List of Indian Navy bases
 India's overseas military bases
 Naval Station Norfolk, world's largest naval base.

References

External links
India Opens Major Western Naval Base Near Karwar, Defense Industry Daily
A base for a blue-water navy, Ravi Sharma, Frontline, Volume 22 - Issue 11, 21 May - 3 June 2005.
Project Seabird: An Example of India's Maritime Prowess, Vijay Sakhuja, Institute for Peace and Conflict Studies, #1580, 13 December 2004.

Kadamba
Karwar